Arkhipovo is a rural locality (a village) in Yukseyevskoye Rural Settlement, Kochyovsky District, Perm Krai, Russia. The population was 7 as of 2010. There are 2 streets.

Geography 
Arkhipovo is located 32 km north of Kochyovo (the district's administrative centre) by road. Vershinino is the nearest rural locality.

References 

Rural localities in Kochyovsky District